Constantina, Rio Grande do Sul is a municipality in the state of Rio Grande do Sul, Brazil. Founded April 14, 1959.  The municipality's motto is "Celeiro da Hospitalidade", meaning "Barn Hospitality".

Geography 
It is a municipality that is part of the microregion of Frederico Westphalen. It is located at latitude 27º44'05 "South and longitude 52º59'32" West, with an altitude of 501 meters.

It has an area of 278.54 km² and its estimated population in 2020 was 9,907 inhabitants.

See also
List of municipalities in Rio Grande do Sul

References

Municipalities in Rio Grande do Sul